Vasco Bergamaschi (29 September 1909 – 24 September 1979) was an Italian professional road racing cyclist.

Career 
Born in San Giacomo delle Segnate, Lombardy, Bergamaschi turned professional in 1930. The highlight of his career was his overall win in the 1935 Giro d'Italia, thanks to the collaboration of his teammate Learco Guerra. His other victories include a Giro del Veneto (1935), a Milano-Modena (1940), another stage in the 1939 Giro d'Italia, and a stage in the 1935 Tour de France.

He later worked as manager for the Torpado team.

Career achievements

Major results

1930
Coppa del Re
Tour de Hongrie
1935
Giro del Veneto
Tour de France:
Winner stage 13A
Giro d'Italia:
 Winner overall classification
Winner stages 1 and 11
1937
Bolzano
Coppa Buttafuocchi Revere
Novi Ligure
1939
Coppa Federale Pisa
Giro d'Italia:
Winner stage 1
1940
Milano – Modena

Grand Tour general classification results timeline

External links 

Official Tour de France results for Vasco Bergamaschi

1909 births
1979 deaths
Cyclists from the Province of Mantua
Italian male cyclists
Giro d'Italia winners
Italian Giro d'Italia stage winners
Italian Tour de France stage winners
20th-century Italian people